The Nuclear Safety and Security Commission (NSSC) is one of a nuclear organizations in South Korea and is run under the Prime Minister's Office. The headquarters are in Jongno District, Seoul.

References

External links

Official website

Government agencies of South Korea
Nuclear technology in South Korea